Krông Kmar is a township and capital of Krông Bông District, Đắk Lắk Province, Vietnam.

References

Populated places in Đắk Lắk province
District capitals in Vietnam
Townships in Vietnam